ꬶ (cross-tailed G, lowercase only) is a letter of the Latin alphabet.

It was used in Teuthonista for the purposes of German dialectology, prior to the development of the International Phonetic Alphabet.

Encoding

References

Phonetic transcription symbols
Latin-script letters